is a Japanese film director and screenwriter. His film Raw Summer won the Fantastic Off-Theatre Competition Grand Prize at the 2006 Yubari International Fantastic Film Festival.

Filmography
Raw Summer (2005)
The Contents of the Desk (2006)
Cafe Isobe (2008)
Triangle (2010)
The Workhorse & the Bigmouth (2013)
Mugiko-san to (2013)
Silver Spoon (2014)Himeanole (2016)Thicker Than Water (2018)I Love Irene (2018)Intolerance (2021)Blue (2021)Kami wa Mikaeri wo Motomeru'' (2022)

References

External links

1975 births
Living people
Japanese film directors
Japanese screenwriters